Sasquatch is an American stoner rock band. The band was formed in 2001 in Los Angeles by Keith Gibbs (guitar, vocals), Rick Ferrante (drums) and Clayton Charles (bass). Charles left the band in 2007 and was replaced by Jason Casanova. The band claims to be influenced by “Black Sabbath, old Soundgarden, Deliverance era Corrosion of Conformity, Mountain, and a bastardized version of Grand Funk Railroad”.

Discography
 2004: Sasquatch
 2006: II
 2010: III
 2013: IV 
 2017: Maneuvers
 2022: Fever Fantasy

References

External links

Rock music groups from California
American stoner rock musical groups
Musical groups established in 2001
2001 establishments in California
American musical trios
Musical groups from Los Angeles